Critical velocity may refer to

Critical ionization velocity, relative velocity between a neutral gas and plasma at which the neutral gas will start to ionize
Speed of sound, at the throat of a rocket (otherwise known as throat velocity)
Landau critical velocity, constant velocity of a superfluid equivalent to the bandgap width divided by the fermi momentum
Velocity at which a liquid transitions from subcritical flow to supercritical flow
The break-up velocity of a rapidly spinning star

Velocity at which leukocytes switch from rolling to freely flowing in a blood vessel